Arrigo Delladio (1 November 1928 in Tesero – 12 September 2015 in Cavalese) was an Italian cross-country skier who competed in the 1950s. He finished 24th in the 18 km event at the 1952 Winter Olympics in Oslo.

Further notable results:
 1953: 3rd, Italian men's championships of cross-country skiing, 15 km
 1954:
 1st, Italian men's championships of cross-country skiing, 30 km
 2nd, Italian men's championships of cross-country skiing, 15 km
 1955:
 2nd, Italian men's championships of cross-country skiing, 30 km
 3rd, Italian men's championships of cross-country skiing, 15 km
 1958: 2nd, Italian men's championships of cross-country skiing, 50 km

References

External links
18 km Olympic cross country results: 1948-52
ALLE ORIGINI DELLA PIEVE DI SAN LORENZO:

1928 births
2015 deaths
Olympic cross-country skiers of Italy
Cross-country skiers at the 1952 Winter Olympics
Cross-country skiers at the 1956 Winter Olympics
Italian male cross-country skiers
Sportspeople from Trentino